Gavin Templeton is an American modern jazz saxophonist, composer and bandleader, called "a pivotal force in the L.A. progressive jazz scene."

Early life and education
Templeton was born in Atlanta, Georgia, and raised in Reno, Nevada. He earned his Bachelor of Music in Jazz Studies at the University of Nevada, Reno, and a master's degree from the California Institute of the Arts. He moved to Los Angeles, California, in 2006, where he is a part of the city's progressive jazz scene.

Career

Solo and with trio
Templeton's debut album, Asterperious Special, was released on Nine Winds Records in 2012, with Templeton on alto saxophone, Larry Koonse on guitar, Gary Fukushima on piano, Darek Oles on bass and Joe LaBarbera on drums. The following year, he released In Series, a modern jazz album featuring jazz-rock arrangements, recorded at Westlake Studios in Los Angeles. It features Templeton as composer and on alto saxophone, Perry Smith on guitar, Sam Minaie on bass, Matt Politano on piano and Matt Mayhall on drums. The album is built thematically around the contrast between material excess and poverty on the west side of Los Angeles.

The Gavin Templeton Trio's Some Spinning, Some At Rest, was released in 2014 on Orenda Records. An album of original compositions by Templeton, it combines composition and improvising, with Templeton on alto saxophone, Richard Giddens on double-bass and Gene Coye on drums. In received 5 out of 5 stars on All About Jazz, and was on the site's Best of 2014 list.

Other work
Templeton is a member of The Daniel Rosenboom Quintet, playing alto saxophone on the 2014 jazz-metal album Fire Keeper, and on Rosenboom's 2015 Astral Transference as part of the octet. He played woodwinds as part of a 22-piece chamber ensemble on the 2015 album Three Kids Music by Gurrisonic Orchestra, and has also collaborated with guitarist Nels Cline, woodwind player Vinny Golia, big band leader Alan Ferber, Charlie Haden, Wayne Shorter and Joe LaBarbera. Templeton performed as a featured artist at the 2014 Angel City Jazz Festival, and with the Daniel Rosenboom Quintet at the 2014 Monterey Jazz Festival.

Discography

Albums

Appears on

References

External links
 Official website

1978 births
Living people
American jazz alto saxophonists
American male saxophonists
Jazz alto saxophonists
American jazz bandleaders
American jazz composers
American male jazz composers
Jazz musicians from California
West Coast jazz saxophonists
Musicians from Atlanta
Musicians from Reno, Nevada
Musicians from Los Angeles
University of Nevada, Reno alumni
California Institute of the Arts alumni
21st-century American saxophonists
21st-century American male musicians